The City of New Orleans also called New Orleans is the largest city in the U.S. state of Louisiana.

City of New Orleans may also refer to:

 City of New Orleans (train), a passenger train service in the United States.
 "City of New Orleans" (song), by Steve Goodman
 City of New Orleans (album), by Willie Nelson
 The City of New Orleans, a steamboat operated by the Anchor Line on the Mississippi River from 1881 to 1898

See also
 New Orleans (disambiguation)